This article provides a summary of Plymouth Argyle's 2004–05 season.

Notable events 

 24 August 2004: The team exit the League Cup in the first round for the 12th consecutive year.
 28 August 2004: Argyle lose their first League game (3–1 to Watford) since Bobby Williamson was appointed as manager.

Competitions

Championship

Table

Results 

Source:

League Cup

FA Cup

Transfers

Out

In

References 

Plymouth Argyle F.C. seasons
Plymouth Argyle